A peace museum is a museum that documents historical peace initiatives.  Many peace museums also provide advocacy programs for nonviolent conflict resolution.  This may include conflicts at the personal, regional or international level.

Peace museums around the world 

 Tehran Peace Museum - Tehran, Iran
 Children's Peace Pavilion – Independence, Missouri, United States
 Dayton International Peace Museum – Dayton, Ohio, United States
 Fukuromachi Elementary School Peace Museum - near the peace park, across the Motuyasu river
 Hiroshima National Peace Memorial Hall for the Atomic Bomb Victims – Hiroshima, Japan; inside the peace park
 Hiroshima Peace Memorial Museum – Hiroshima, Japan; inside the Hiroshima Peace Memorial Park
 Honkawa Elementary School Peace Museum – Hiroshima, Japan; near the peace park, across the Honkawa river
 IJzertoren – Diksmuide, West Flanders, Belgium
 Kyoto Museum for World Peace – Kyoto, Japan
 Mémorial de Caen – Caen, Normandy, France
 Nagasaki Atomic Bomb Museum – Nagasaki, Japan
 Norwegian Nobel Institute – Oslo, Norway
 Osaka International Peace Center
 Peace Museum – Bradford, West Yorkshire, England, United Kingdom
 The Peace Museum – Chicago, Illinois, United States (closed)
 Yi Jun Peace Museum - The Hague, Netherlands

See also

 International Network of Museums for Peace
 Lists of museums

External links 
 Peace Museums

References 

 

Lists of museums by subject